Twisted Records is a British record label that specialises in psychedelic trance music. The label was founded by musician Simon Posford, who performs and records under the name Hallucinogen.

See also
 List of electronic music record labels
 List of record labels

External links
 
 

Psychedelic trance record labels
British record labels
Record labels established in 1996